Blackaller is a surname. Notable people with the surname include:

 John Blackaller ( 1494–1563), English politician
 Tom Blackaller (1940–1989), American yachtsman, sailmaker, and racing driver